Robert Fohr (born 1954) is a French art historian, translator and author. Since 2006 he has been head of the Sponsorship Mission at the French Ministry of Culture.

Between 1981 and 1983 he was resident pensionnaire at the French Academy in Rome.

In 2008 he received the Paul Marmottan prize from the Paris Academy of Fine Arts for his monograph Georges de La Tour le maître des nuits.

Works
(includes collaborations and translations)

 Tout l'œuvre peint de Bruegel l'Ancien (1981)
 Inventaire des collections publiques françaises (1982)
 Tours, musée des Beaux-Arts (1982)
 Patrice Alexandre (1983)
 Tout l'œuvre peint d'Ingres (1984)
 Tout l'œuvre peint de Vermeer (1985)
 La norme et le caprice redécouvertes en art aspects du goût... (1986)
 Rediscoveries in art... (1986)
 Guy Brunet l'horizon de l'atelier (1990)
 Chagall: la période russe (1991)
 Giovanni Battista Piranesi, 1720-1778... (1991)
 Georges de La Tour le maître des nuits (1998)
 Daumier sculpteur et peintre (1999)

References

1954 births
French art historians
French male non-fiction writers
Living people